The thirty-fourth season of the American animated television series The Simpsons premiered on Fox on September 25, 2022. The season will consist of twenty-two episodes. The series was later renewed for seasons 35 and 36 on January 26, 2023.

Production
The season was announced on March 3, 2021, when it was revealed that The Simpsons had been renewed for its thirty-third and thirty-fourth. The season is the first in which two Treehouse of Horror episodes are aired in a single season: a single 20-minute parody of the 2017 supernatural horror film It, followed by the traditional anthology episode the following week.

Promotion
In October 2022, The Simpsons' official Twitter announced a Pennywise–Krusty the Clown themed fan art contest, winners would have their fan art featured in the end credits of the season's "Treehouse of Horror".

Episodes

References

External links
 

2022 American television seasons
Simpsons season 34
2023 American television seasons